This is a list of fish harbours of Pakistan. Most of these were built from 2002 onwards but have been controversial because of damage to the local environments.

 Damb Fish Harbour, Lasbela District
 Gadani Fish Harbour, Lasbela District
 Gwadar Fish Harbour, Gwadar District
 Karachi Fish Harbour, Karachi Central District
 Korangi Fish Harbour, Korangi District
 Ormara Fish Harbour, Gwadar District
 Pasni Fish Harbour, Gwadar District
 Pishukan Fish Harbour, Gwadar District

See also 
 Fishing in Pakistan

References 

 
Pakistan geography-related lists